Bobrowska Wola  is a village in the administrative district of Gmina Kluczewsko, within Włoszczowa County, Świętokrzyskie Voivodeship, in south-central Poland.

Its Latitude is 50.9667° N and Longitude is 19.8833° E

Time Zone is  :   GMT +1.0

References

Bobrowska Wola